Marion Township is the name of 11 townships in the U.S. state of Missouri:

 Marion Township, Buchanan County, Missouri
 Marion Township, Newton County, Missouri
 Marion Township, Mercer County, Missouri
 Marion Township, Cole County, Missouri
 Marion Township, Dade County, Missouri
 Marion Township, St. Francois County, Missouri
 Marion Township, Daviess County, Missouri
 Marion Township, Grundy County, Missouri
 Marion Township, Jasper County, Missouri
 Marion Township, Harrison County, Missouri
 Marion Township, Monroe County, Missouri

Marion Township also appears in the following 4 townships (all in Polk County, Missouri):

Northeast Marion Township
Northwest Marion Township
Southeast Marion Township
Southwest Marion Township

See also 
 Marion Township (disambiguation)

Missouri township disambiguation pages